Panayır Island, deriving from its Greek name Panagia, is an Aegean island of Turkey. It was once known as Ziraat Island ("Agriculture Island"). It is now also known as Altın Adası ("Gold Island").

Currently the island is uninhabited. But there is an abandoned church, a building of the Ministry of Agriculture and a lighthouse in the island. The island was used to be officially recognized as a SIT area (archaeological site). But in 2010, Ministry of Environment and Urban Planning ended its SIT status. Now there is an intense discussion on the future of the island

References

Aegean islands
Islands of Turkey
Islands of Aydın Province
Didim District